Cristian Iván Lucero (born 13 February 1988) is an Argentine footballer who plays as a forward.

Career
Lucero previously played for CSyD San Carlos in Liga Mercedina. He appeared for Deportivo Muñiz in the 2013–14 Primera D Metropolitana campaign, participating in seven matches as they finished twelfth. Primera B Metropolitana side Platense subsequently signed Lucero. Three professional league appearances followed in 2014.

Career statistics
.

References

External links

1988 births
Living people
Place of birth missing (living people)
Argentine footballers
Association football forwards
Primera D Metropolitana players
Primera B Metropolitana players
Club Social y Deportivo Muñiz footballers
Club Atlético Platense footballers